Claudin 25 is a protein that in humans is encoded by the CLDN25 gene.

Function

This gene encodes a member of the claudin family. Claudins are integral membrane proteins and components of tight junction strands. Tight junction strands serve as a physical barrier to prevent solutes and water from passing freely through the paracellular space between epithelial or endothelial cell sheets, and also play critical roles in maintaining cell polarity and signal transductions. [provided by RefSeq, Jun 2010].

References

Further reading